Defending champions Lisa Raymond and Mike Bryan lost in the first round to Arantxa Sánchez Vicario and Daniel Nestor.

Tatiana Golovin and Richard Gasquet won the title, defeating Cara Black and Wayne Black in the final.

Seeds
  Elena Likhovtseva /  Mahesh Bhupathi (first round)
  Virginia Ruano Pascual /  Mark Knowles (second round)
  Lisa Raymond /  Mike Bryan (first round)
  Cara Black /  Wayne Black (final)
  Rennae Stubbs /  Kevin Ullyett (second round)
  Martina Navratilova /  Leander Paes (second round)
  Alicia Molik /  Paul Hanley (quarterfinals)
  Myriam Casanova /  Cyril Suk (first round)

Draw

Finals

Top half

Bottom half

External links
 Main draw
2004 French Open – Doubles draws and results at the International Tennis Federation

Mixed Doubles
French Open by year – Mixed doubles